"Shower Me with Your Love" is a 1989 single by American band Surface from their second studio album 2nd Wave (1988). The song was one of their most popular to date becoming the group's second number one on the Billboard Hot Black Singles chart, where it stayed for one week. "Shower Me with Your Love" was also a successful crossover hit peaking at number five on the Hot 100.

Charts

Weekly charts

Year-end charts

References

1988 songs
1989 singles
Surface (band) songs
1980s ballads
Soul ballads
Songs written by Bernard Jackson (singer)